NGC 374 is a spiral or lenticular galaxy located in the constellation Pisces. It was discovered on October 7, 1861 by Heinrich d'Arrest. It was described by Dreyer as "faint, small, between two 15th magnitude stars."

References

External links
 

0374
18611007
Pisces (constellation)
Discoveries by Heinrich Louis d'Arrest
Spiral galaxies
003952